Damacharla Janardhana Rao is a Politician of the Telugu Desam Party from Andhra Pradesh.

Early life
He is the grandson of the former Minister, Damacharla Anjaneyulu. He did his schooling and Intermediate in Vignan College at Vadlamudi. He did his BTech in P.E.S from Institute of Technology (PES University) at Bangalore in 1998.

Political career

He started his political career in TDP and has elected as Prakasam district party president in 2010 and from then until present date he is carrying the party in the district. He expected Kondepi constituency MLA ticket from TDP in 2009 which was vacant due to death of his grandfather, but the seat was reserved to SC in de limitation therefore he did not contest in 2009 election. He contested from Ongole by election in 2012 and lost against Balineni Srinivasa Reddy later in 2014 he won from the same constituency against Balineni with a good majority of 12,428 votes. After that in the 2019 Andhra Pradesh State Legislative Assembly Elections he was defeated by his arch-rival Balineni Srinivasa Reddy with a majority of 22,400 votes.

References

External links
https://www.facebook.com/damacharla.janardhan.9

Living people
Telugu Desam Party politicians
Andhra Pradesh MLAs 2014–2019
People from Ongole
Year of birth missing (living people)